Catalunyan Saddle (Katalunska Sedlovina \ka-ta-'lun-ska se-dlo-vi-'na\) is a saddle of 1260 m height in the Friesland Ridge of the Tangra Mountains on Livingston Island, in the South Shetland Islands.  The saddle is bounded by Lyaskovets Peak to the east and by Presian Ridge to the west.  The saddle was named in honour of the Catalans Francesc Sàbat (q.v. Sàbat Hill) and Jorge Enrique (q.v. Enrique Hill) from Juan Carlos I Base who established the first route via the saddle to Mount Friesland on 30 December 1991.

Location
Part of the saddle is occupied by an amazingly shaped ice-covered feature called the Sphinx.

The saddle was occupied by a bivouac of the Bulgarian Tangra 2004/05 Survey team (Lyubomir Ivanov and Doychin Vasilev) during 14 December–16 December 2004 and was mapped in 2005.

Maps
 L.L. Ivanov et al. Antarctica: Livingston Island and Greenwich Island, South Shetland Islands. Scale 1:100000 topographic map. Sofia: Antarctic Place-names Commission of Bulgaria, 2005.
 L.L. Ivanov. Antarctica: Livingston Island and Greenwich, Robert, Snow and Smith Islands. Scale 1:120000 topographic map.  Troyan: Manfred Wörner Foundation, 2009.  
 L.L. Ivanov. Antarctica: Livingston Island and Smith Island. Scale 1:100000 topographic map. Manfred Wörner Foundation, 2017.

Gallery

References
 Catalunyan Saddle. SCAR Composite Antarctic Gazetteer
 Bulgarian Antarctic Gazetteer. Antarctic Place-names Commission. (details in Bulgarian, basic data in English)
 D. Gildea. Mountaineering in Antarctica: complete guide: Travel guide. Primento and Editions Nevicata, 2015. 
 Antarctica: Livingston Island, Climb Magazine, Issue 14, Kettering, UK, April 2006, pp. 89-91.

External links
 Catalunyan Saddle. Copernix satellite image

Tangra Mountains
Catalonia
Spain and the Antarctic